The Bank of Tamil Eelam was founded in Jaffna in 1994 by the Sri Lankan separatist organization LTTE , but was relocated in 1995, to Kilinochchi after the Sri Lankan army retook the peninsula. The Bank of Tamil Eelam had six branch offices and employed around 100 employees. The Bank of Tamil Eelam was suspended on January 2, 2009, following the capture of Kilinochchi, which had been the administrative capital of self-proclaimed Tamil Eelam.

References

External links

 reuters.com
 tamilnet.com

Liberation Tigers of Tamil Eelam

Banks established in 1994
Banks disestablished in 2009
2009 disestablishments in Sri Lanka
Sri Lankan companies established in 1994